The lower divisions of the 2015 Rugby Europe Sevens were the first with a new classification, where prior years split Division B into two geographical zones. For the inaugural year of the format, Division C was held in Zenica, Bosnia and Herzegovina, with twelve teams contesting five spots for Division B. Division B then played a twelve-team tournament in Zagreb, Croatia, with the two top-placing teams advancing to the 2016 Trophy, and the champion advancing to the Rugby Europe repechage tournament for a chance to qualify for the Olympic qualification tournament.

Division C

Ireland dominated the competition, winning all six matches, while scoring 47 tries and conceding only four. Their try scoring was led by Adam Byrne (8), followed by captain Tom Daly (7), and Alex Wootton (6).

Standings

Pool stage

Pool A

Pool B

Pool C

Knockout stage

Bowl

Plate

Cup

Division B
Ireland dominated the competition with six straight victories with winning margins of greater than 50-points, scoring 60 tries and conceding 0. Ireland’s Alex Wootton topped the scoring charts with 10 tries, with Shane Layden and David McGuigan scoring 7 tries apiece. The Player of the Tournament award went to Ireland’s Adam Byrne.

Standings

Pool stage

Pool A

Pool B

Pool C

Knockout stage

Bowl

Plate

Cup

References

Divisions
2015 rugby sevens competitions
2015 in Bosnia and Herzegovina sport
2015 in Croatian sport